The supreme governor of the Church of England is the titular head of the Church of England, a position which is vested in the British monarch. Although the monarch's authority over the Church of England is largely ceremonial and is mostly observed in a symbolic capacity, the position is still very relevant to the church. As the supreme governor, the monarch formally appoints high-ranking members of the church on the advice of the prime minister of the United Kingdom, who in turn acts on the advice of the Crown Nominations Commission. Historically, the Supreme Governors have been members of Christian denominations other than the Church of England.

History 
By 1536, King Henry VIII of England had broken with the Holy See, seized assets of the Catholic Church in England and Wales and declared the Church of England as the established church with himself as its supreme head. The Act of Supremacy 1534 confirmed the king's status as having supremacy over the church and required the peers to swear an oath recognising Henry's supremacy. Henry's daughter Mary I attempted to restore the English Church's allegiance to the pope and repealed the Act of Supremacy in 1555. Elizabeth I ascended to the throne in 1558 and the Parliament passed the Act of Supremacy 1558 which restored the original act. To placate critics, the Oath of Supremacy which peers were required to swear, gave the monarch's title as supreme governor rather than supreme head of the church. This wording avoided the charge that the monarchy was claiming divinity or usurping Christ, whom the Bible explicitly identifies as head of the Church.

"Defender of the Faith" (Fidei Defensor) has been part of the English (and since the Union of Scotland and England, British) monarch's title since Henry VIII was granted it by Pope Leo X in 1521 in recognition of Henry's role in opposing the Protestant Reformation. The pope withdrew the title, but it was later reconferred by Parliament in the reign of Edward VI.

Thirty-Nine Articles
The position of the monarch role is acknowledged in the preface to the Thirty-Nine Articles of 1562. It states that:

Article 37 makes this claim to royal supremacy more explicit:

Church of Scotland 
The British monarch vows to uphold the constitution of the Church of Scotland (a Presbyterian national church), but does not hold a leadership position in it. Nevertheless, the monarch appoints the Lord High Commissioner to the General Assembly of the Church of Scotland as their personal representative, with a ceremonial role. Queen Elizabeth II on occasion filled the role personally, as when she opened the General Assembly in 1977 and 2002 (her Silver and Golden Jubilee years).

List of supreme governors

References

Anglicanism
History of the Church of England
British monarchy
English monarchy
Church of England lists
1536 establishments in England